The 130th King George's Own Baluchis (Jacob's Rifles) was an infantry regiment of the British Indian Army raised in June 1858 as the 1st Belooch Rifles; re-designated as 1st Regiment Jacob's Rifles in September. It was designated as 130th Jacob's Baluchis in 1903 becoming 5th Battalion (King George's Own) 10th Baluch Regiment (Jacob's Rifles) in 1922. In 1947, it was allotted to Pakistan Army, where it continues to exist as 12th Battalion of The Baloch Regiment.

Early history
In 1858, Major John Jacob raised two local 'silladar' infantry battalions known as Belooch Rifles (re-designated as Jacob's Rifles soon after); the only silladar infantry to have existed in the Indian Army. These battalions soon earned a formidable reputation in and around Jacobabad for keeping the peace on the Sindh frontier as part of the Sind Frontier Field Force. In 1861, the first of these was accorded regular status, becoming the 30th Regiment of Bombay Native Infantry or Jacob's Rifles, while the second was disbanded. The regiment fought in the Second Afghan War of 1878–80 and suffered heavy casualties at the Battle of Maiwand. In 1881, it was reconstituted as a Baluch battalion and re-designated as the 30th Regiment (Jacob's) Bombay Native Infantry or 3rd Belooch Regiment. In 1900, it was sent to China to suppress the Boxer Rebellion.

130th King George's Own Baluchis (Jacob's Rifles)
Subsequent to the reforms brought about in the Indian Army by Lord Kitchener in 1903, all former Bombay Army units had 100 added to their numbers, and the regiment's designation was changed to 130th Jacob's Baluchis. In 1906, the Prince of Wales (later George V) was appointed Colonel-in-Chief of the regiment. The regimental full dress uniform in 1914 included a rifle green turban and kurta (knee length tunic) piped in red, worn with red trousers and white gaiters. The red trousers were a distinctive feature of all five Baluch infantry regiments then serving in the Indian Army. During the First World War the regiment served in German East Africa and Palestine. In 1918 it raised a second battalion, which was disbanded in 1920.

Subsequent History
In 1922, the regiment was grouped with the five other Baluch battalions: 1st & 2nd Battalions of 124th Duchess of Connaught's Own Baluchistan Infantry, 126th Baluchistan Infantry, 127th Queen Mary's Own Baluch Light Infantry and the 129th Duke of Connaught's Own Baluchis, to form the 10th Baluch Regiment. The regiment's new designation was 5th Battalion (King George's Own) 10th Baluch Regiment (Jacob's Rifles). During the Second World War, 5/10th Baluch served in Burma Campaign. The battalion's performance in the war was highly commendable. It suffered a total of 575 casualties and received a number of gallantry awards. On the Partition of India in 1947, the battalion, along with the Baluch Regiment was allocated to Pakistan Army. In 1956, the 8th Punjab and Bahawalpur Regiments were merged with the Baluch Regiment and 5 Baluch was redesignated as 12 Baluch (now 12 Baloch). During the Indo-Pakistani War of 1965, the battalion fought in the Kasur Sector.

Genealogy
1858	1st Belooch Rifles
1858	1st Regiment Jacob's Rifles 
1861	Jacob's Rifles
1861	30th Regiment Bombay Native Infantry or Jacob's Rifles
1881	30th Regiment (Jacob's) Bombay Native Infantry or 3rd Belooch Regiment
1885	30th Regiment (Jacob's) Bombay Infantry or 3rd Belooch Regiment
1888	30th Regiment (3rd Belooch Battalion) Bombay Infantry
1892	30th Regiment (3rd Baluch Battalion) Bombay Infantry or 30th Baluchis
1901	30th Baluch Infantry
1903	130th Jacob's Baluchis
1906	130th Prince of Wales's Own Baluchis
1910	130th Prince of Wales's Own Baluchis (Jacob's Rifles)
1910	130th King George's Own Baluchis (Jacob's Rifles)
1918	1st Battalion 130th King George's Own Baluchis (Jacob's Rifles)
1920	130th King George's Own Baluchis (Jacob's Rifles)
1922	5th Battalion (King George's Own) 10th Baluch Regiment (Jacob's Rifles) or 5/10th Baluch
1937	5th Battalion (King George V's Own) 10th Baluch Regiment (Jacob's Rifles)
1945	5th Battalion (King George V's Own) The Baluch Regiment (Jacob's Rifles) or 5 Baluch
1956	12th Battalion The Baluch Regiment or 12 Baluch
1991	12th Battalion The Baloch Regiment or 12 Baloch

See also
10th Baluch Regiment
The Baloch Regiment
Brigadier General John Jacob, CB

References

Further reading
 Ahmad, Lt Col Rifat Nadeem. (2017). History of the Baloch Regiment. Abbottabad: The Baloch Regimental Centre.
 Ahmad, Lt Col Rifat Nadeem. (2010). Battle Honours of the Baloch Regiment. Abbottabad: The Baloch Regimental Centre.
 Ahmed, Maj Gen Rafiuddin. (1998). History of the Baloch Regiment 1820–1939. Abbottabad: The Baloch Regimental Centre. 
 Ahmed, Maj Gen Rafiuddin. (2000). History of the Baloch Regiment 1939–1956. Abbottabad: The Baloch Regimental Centre. 
 Barthorp, Michael, & Jeffrey Burn. (1979). Indian Infantry Regiments 1860–1914. Osprey Publishing. 
 Cadell, Sir Patrick. (1938). History of the Bombay Army. London: Longmans & Green
Gaylor, John (1992). Sons of John Company: Indian and Pakistan Armies, 1903–1991, Spellmount Publishers Ltd. .
 Thatcher, WS. (1980). The Tenth Baluch Regiment in the Second World War. Abbottabad: The Baluch Regimental Centre.

External links
History of the Baloch Regiment 1820–1939 the Colonial Period, text of pages 1 to 15 available online as download preview

Baloch Regiment
British Indian Army infantry regiments
Military units and formations established in 1858
1858 establishments in India
1858 establishments in British India
Military units and formations disestablished in 1922